TrekStor GmbH & Co. KG is a German manufacturer of portable storage products, audio devices and tablet computers incorporated in 2001 and located in Bensheim, Germany.

The company is primarily known for its MP3 players, hard disk drives, tablet computers and USB flash drives. TrekStor is a well-known brand of digital media players in Germany.

After this was pointed out, they soon renamed the player the TrekStor Blaxx.

In July 2009 the company announced its insolvency. However, an investor (TrekStor GmbH now part of Hong-Kong based Telefield International Holdings Limited)  was found and the company could continue its business. In 2010 an eBook reader was released. TrekStor also develops its own series of tablet computers.

References

External links 
 Official site

Companies based in Hesse
Audio equipment manufacturers of Germany
German brands
Portable audio player manufacturers